Protein Hook homolog 3 is a protein that in humans is encoded by the HOOK3 gene.

Function 

Hook proteins are cytosolic coiled coil proteins that contain conserved N-terminal domains, which attach to microtubules, and more divergent C-terminal domains, which mediate binding to organelles. The Drosophila Hook protein is a component of the endocytic compartment.

References

Further reading